The England women's national under-16 basketball team is a national basketball team of England, administered by the Basketball England. It represents the country in women's international under-16 basketball competitions.

The team participated 11 times at the FIBA U16 Women's European Championship Division B. Their best results were the second places in 2011 and 2014. In 2012 and 2015, they participated at the FIBA U16 Women's European Championship Division A; in both occasions, they finished in 16th place.

See also
England women's national basketball team
England women's national under-18 basketball team
England men's national under-16 basketball team

References

External links
Archived records of England team participations

Basketball in England
Women's national under-16 basketball teams
Basketball